Gregory Brian Minton (born July 29, 1951), nicknamed "Moon Man", is a former Major League Baseball (MLB) right-handed pitcher who played for the California Angels and San Francisco Giants.

Career
A crippling injury in  caused Minton to alter his delivery. Instead of using his high leg kick, Minton shortened his stride to take pressure off his knee. The new delivery gave Minton a 92-mph sinker that batters were unable to drive. Minton went three full seasons (269 innings) without allowing a home run until John Stearns homered against him on May 2, 1982. , this is the longest such streak in the period for which game-by-game data is available (since 1904). Also in 1982, Minton appeared in his only All-Star Game and finished sixth in National League Cy Young Award voting. On August 14, 1986, Minton gave up the last of Pete Rose's MLB record 4,256 career hits.
 
In 1989, Minton made 62 appearances in relief. He earned eight saves and a 2.20 earned run average (ERA). Over portions of 1988 and 1989, he pitched another  consecutive innings without giving up a home run, which was the longest stretch of this type by any pitcher in Angels history. He signed a one-year extension for 1990 worth $850,000. He spent much of the 1990 season on the disabled list with elbow problems, and he pitched only  innings before announcing his retirement that October.

After his career as a player, Minton was a pitching coach in the California Angels organization and managed the independent Lubbock Crickets for two years.

Personal
Minton's nickname, "Moon Man," stemmed from various escapades such as the hijacking of the team bus and the flooding of a minor league ballpark so he could leave Amarillo one day early at the end of the season.

Minton is currently married to Kari Jill Granville, a Phoenix attorney and former USA Archery team member.

See also
List of MLB individual streaks

References

External links

1951 births
Living people
Amarillo Giants players
Baseball players from Texas
Billings Mustangs players
California Angels players
Cardenales de Lara players
American expatriate baseball players in Venezuela
Fresno Giants players
Major League Baseball pitchers
Midland Angels players
Minor league baseball managers
National League All-Stars
Palm Springs Angels players
Phoenix Giants players
San Diego Mesa College alumni
San Francisco Giants players
San Jose Bees players
Sportspeople from Lubbock, Texas
Tiburones de La Guaira players
Waterloo Royals players